Michl is a surname and male given name.

Surname
Notable people with this surname include:
 Andreas Michl (born 1980), Austrian football player
 František Michl (1901–1977), Czech graphic artist
 Josef Michl (born 1939), Czechoslovak-American chemist
 József Michl (born 1960), Hungarian politician
 Petr Michl (born 1970), Czech cross-country skier

Given name
Notable people with this given name include:
 Michl Ebner (born 1952), Italian politician
 Michl Lang (1899–1979), German stage and film actor